The 1922–23 SK Rapid Wien season was the 25th season in club history.

Squad

Squad and statistics

Squad statistics

Fixtures and results

League

Cup

References

1922-23 Rapid Wien Season
Rapid
Austrian football championship-winning seasons